Abebe Zerihun (born 18 February 1955) is an Ethiopian middle-distance runner. He competed in the men's 800 metres at the 1980 Summer Olympics.

References

1955 births
Living people
Athletes (track and field) at the 1980 Summer Olympics
Ethiopian male middle-distance runners
Olympic athletes of Ethiopia
Place of birth missing (living people)